The Palais des congrès de Montréal is a convention centre in Montreal's Quartier international at the north end of Old Montreal. Its borough is Ville-Marie. Construction began in 1977 and completed in 1983; the Palais opened on 21 May 1983. Victor Prus designed the original building.

Place-d'Armes station is located in the building with an underground connection to and from the convention centre.

Some of the land for Palais des congrès was expropriated from Chinatown, Montreal, along with building of Complexe Guy-Favreau. Plans to expand the Palais began in 1997. The expansion was designed by a consortium of three firms: Tétrault Parent Languedoc; Saia Barbarese Topouzanov; and Aedifica, with Hal Ingberg.

Notes

Sources

External links
 
 

Government buildings in Montreal
Convention centres in Canada
Downtown Montreal
Government buildings completed in 1983
Olympic International Broadcast Centres